The Medical Dental Building is located at 837 Southwest 11th Avenue, in Portland, Oregon, United States. It was designed by Leigh L. Dougan, and completed in 1928.

The building underwent exterior renovations in 2012.

Tenants
The building has housed the restaurants Dime Store and East India Co. Grill and Bar.

References

External links
 

1928 establishments in Oregon
Buildings and structures completed in 1928
Skyscrapers in Portland, Oregon
Southwest Portland, Oregon